The 2021–22 Coupe de France preliminary rounds, Méditerranée was the qualifying competition to decide which teams from the leagues of the Méditerranée region of France took part in the main competition from the seventh round.

A total of five teams qualified from the Méditerranée preliminary rounds. In 2020–21, Aubagne FC progressed furthest in the main competition, reaching the round of 32 before losing to Toulouse.

Draws and fixtures
On 9 July 2021, the league announced that 246 teams had entered the competition from the region, and that because of the number of teams a preliminary round would need to take place.  On 26 July 2021, the league published the draw for the preliminary round, with 30 teams entering from the district league level. The first round draw, which saw the entry of the remaining district level teams and teams from Régionale 2, was published on 9 August 2021. The second round draw, which saw the entry of the remaining Régionale 2 teams and those from Régionale 1, was published on 31 August 2021. The third round draw was published on 8 September 2021. The fourth round draw was published on 21 September 2021. The draws for the fifth and sixth round were made on 6 October 2021.

Preliminary round
These matches were played on 22 August 2021.

First round
These matches were played on 28 and 29 August 2021.

Second round
These matches were played on 5 September 2021, with one postponed until 15 September 2021.

Third round
These matches were played on 18 and 19 September 2021.

Fourth round
These matches were played on 2 and 3 October 2021.

Fifth round
These matches were played on 16 and 17 October 2021.

Sixth round
These matches were played on 31 October 2021.

References

preliminary rounds